Nembrotha is a genus of sea slugs, nudibranchs, marine gastropod molluscs in the family Polyceridae.

Nembrotha is the type genus of the subfamily Nembrothinae.

Species 
Species in the genus Nembrotha include:

 Nembrotha aurea Pola, Cervera & Gosliner, 2008
 Nembrotha chamberlaini Gosliner & Behrens, 1997
 Nembrotha cristata Bergh, 1877
 Nembrotha kubaryana Bergh, 1877 
 Nembrotha lineolata Bergh, 1905
 Nembrotha livingstonei Sllan, 1933
 Nembrotha megalocera Yonow, 1990
 Nembrotha milleri Gosliner & Behrens, 1997
 Nembrotha mullineri  Gosliner & Behrens, 1997 
 Nembrotha purpureolineata O'Donoghue, 1924 
 Nembrotha rosannulata Pola, Cervera & Gosliner, 2008
 Nembrotha yonowae Goethel & Debelius, 1992
Species brought into synonymy
 Nembrotha affinis Eliot, 1904: synonym of Tambja affinis (Eliot, 1904)
 Nembrotha arnoldi Burn, 1957 : synonym of Gymnodoris arnoldi (Burn, 1957)
 Nembrotha capensis Bergh, 1907: synonym of Tambja capensis (Bergh, 1907)
 Nembrotha diaphana Bergh, 1877: synonym of Tambja diaphana (Bergh, 1877)
 Nembrotha divae Er. Marcus, 1958: synonym of Martadoris divae (Er. Marcus, 1958)
 Nembrotha edwardsi (Angas, 1864): synonym of Crimora edwardsi (Angas, 1864)
 Nembrotha eliora Er. Marcus & Ev. Marcus, 1967: synonym of Tambja eliora (Er. Marcus & Ev. Marcus, 1967)
 Nembrotha gracilis Bergh, 1877: synonym of Roboastra gracilis (Bergh, 1877)
 Nembrotha gratiosa Bergh, 1890: synonym of Tambja gratiosa (Bergh, 1890)
 Nembrotha guttata Yonow, 1993: synonym of Nembrotha yonowae Goethel & Debelius, 1992
 Nembrotha hubbsi Lance, 1968: synonym of Tambja eliora (Er. Marcus & Ev. Marcus, 1967)
 Nembrotha limaciformis Eliot, 1908: synonym of Martadoris limaciformis (Eliot, 1908)
 Nembrotha morosa Bergh, 1877: synonym of Tambja morosa (Bergh, 1877)
 Nembrotha nigerrima Bergh, 1877: synonym of Nembrotha kubaryana Bergh, 1877
 Nembrotha rutilans Pruvot-Fol, 1931: synonym of Nembrotha purpureolineata O'Donoghue, 1924
 Nembrotha sagamiana Baba, 1955: synonym of Tambja sagamiana (Baba, 1955)
 Nembrotha tabescens (Risbec, 1928): synonym of Martadoris limaciformis (Eliot, 1908)
 Nembrotha verconis Basedow & Hedley, 1905: synonym of Tambja verconis (Basedow & Hedley, 1905)

References

Polyceridae